Lloyd William "Eppa" Johnson (December 24, 1910 – October 8, 1980) was a Major League Baseball pitcher who played in one game with the Pittsburgh Pirates on April 21, 1934.

External links

1910 births
1980 deaths
Major League Baseball pitchers
Pittsburgh Pirates players
Baseball players from California
People from Santa Rosa, California
Sportspeople from Santa Rosa, California